If You Can't Beat 'Em, Bite 'Em is the third album by Weird War.

Track listing
"Intro (Music for Masturbation)" − 1:42
"Grand Fraud" − 3:24
"Tess" − 3:00
"If You Can't Beat 'Em, Bite 'Em" − 3:58
vocals by Jennifer Herrema (as "JJ Rox")
"Moment in Time" − 4:38
"Store Bought Pot" − 4:22
"AK-47" − 3:43
"N.D.S.P." − 4:34
"Chemical Rank" − 3:39
"Lickin' Stick" − 3:43
piano by Azita
"One by One" − 4:18

References

2004 albums
Weird War albums
Drag City (record label) albums